Aslauga prouvosti, the Prouvost's aslauga, is a butterfly in the family Lycaenidae. It is found in Cameroon, the Democratic Republic of the Congo (Shaba) and western and north-western Tanzania.

References

External links
Images representing Aslauga prouvosti at Barcodes of Life

Butterflies described in 1997
Aslauga